The 1982 Victorian state election was held on 3 April 1982.

Retiring Members

Labor
Dolph Eddy MLC (Thomastown)
Bon Thomas MLC (Melbourne West)
Ivan Trayling MLC (Melbourne)
John Walton MLC (Melbourne North)

Liberal
Jim Balfour MLA (Narracan)
Hayden Birrell MLA (Geelong West)
Roberts Dunstan MLA (Dromana)
Geoff Hayes MLA (Wantirna)
Aurel Smith MLA (South Barwon)
Murray Hamilton MLC (Higinbotham)

National
Tom Trewin MLA (Benalla)

Legislative Assembly
Sitting members are shown in bold text. Successful candidates are highlighted in the relevant colour. Where there is possible confusion, an asterisk (*) is also used.

Legislative Council
Sitting members are shown in bold text. Successful candidates are highlighted in the relevant colour. Where there is possible confusion, an asterisk (*) is also used.

References

Psephos - Adam Carr's Election Archive

Victoria
Candidates for Victorian state elections